is a 2019 drama film written and directed by Kiyoshi Kurosawa. It stars Atsuko Maeda, Shota Sometani, Tokio Emoto, Adiz Rajabov, and Ryo Kase. It was released in Japan on 14 June 2019. It screened as the closing film at the 72nd Locarno Film Festival on 17 August 2019.

Plot
Yoko (played by the former leading member of the idol girl group AKB48, Atsuko Maeda) is the reporter for a television travel program who visits Uzbekistan with her television crew to make an episode for the program. She dreams of becoming a singer. The film contrasts Yoko's upbeat on-camera persona with her internal conflicts when she is on her own.

The film consists of a series of episodes in which Yoko wades into a lake to describe looking for a possibly mythical Uzbeki fish; proclaims the delicious crunchiness of under-cooked rice in a bowl of plov, a local dish; repeatedly takes nausea-inducing turns on a fun-park pendulum ride until her camera crew can get enough B-camera footage of her face; and tries to liberate a goat in captivity named Okoo only to learn that if she does, it will be eaten by wild dogs.

She and the crew visit Samarkand and Tashkent; in the latter, she sings the classic Édith Piaf anthem, Hymne à l'amour (with Japanese lyrics], in a fantasy sequence set at the Navoi Theatre which (as noted below) had been built after the war by Japanese POWs. During a visit to the bazaar, she wanders off with a hand-held camera and starts videotaping in a restricted area.  She runs away from the police, who eventually apprehend her but treat her kindly, especially when she learns that her firefighter boyfriend may have been involved in a massive oil refinery fire in Tokyo Bay, where he was stationed.  (The boyfriend is never actually seen or heard; all the audience learns about him comes from texts he exchanges with Yoko.)

In a finale set in the mountains, her crew once again in pursuit of a likely mythical beast, she again sings Hymne à l'amour as she imagines that she has caught sight of Okoo running free in the distance.

Cast
 Atsuko Maeda as Yoko
 Shota Sometani as Yoshioka
 Tokio Emoto as Sasaki
 Adiz Rajabov as Temur
 Ryo Kase as Iwao

Production
The film was made to commemorate the 25th anniversary of diplomatic relations between Japan and Uzbekistan, as well as the 70th anniversary of the Navoi Theater, which was built by the forced labour of Japanese POWs after World War II. The filming took place in Uzbekistan.

Release
The film was released in Japan on 14 June 2019. It screened as the closing film at the 72nd Locarno Film Festival on 17 August 2019. It also screened at the 2019 Toronto International Film Festival, the 2019 BFI London Film Festival, the 24th Busan International Film Festival, and the 2019 New York Film Festival.

Reception
The site's critical consensus reads, "To the Ends of the Earth finds filmmaker Kiyoshi Kurosawa crafting an insightful evocation of the feeling of being far from home." On Metacritic, the film has a weighted average score of 85 out of 100, based on 10 critics, indicating "universal acclaim".

Mark Schilling of The Japan Times gave the film 3.5 out of 5 stars, describing it as "a uniquely Kurosawa mix of showbiz comedy, woman-in-jeopardy thriller and romantic drama with Maeda's lonely-but-intrepid heroine serving as the strong connecting thread." Sam C. Mac of Slant Magazine gave the film 4 out of 4 stars, writing, "To the Ends of the Earth isn't, by any measure, a horror film, but it uses aesthetic and philosophical foundations that Kurosawa laid in his genre work to insinuate tensions and anxieties lurking beneath the serene surface of everyday life." Neil Young of The Hollywood Reporter wrote, "Officially endorsed international co-productions are usually stilted, self-consciously didactic affairs; the seasoned but adventurous hands of Kurosawa, however, here yield quietly immersive and spellbinding results."

References

External links
  
 

2019 films
2019 drama films
2010s Japanese films
Japanese drama films
Uzbekistani drama films
Qatari drama films
2010s Japanese-language films
Uzbek-language films
Films set in Uzbekistan
Films shot in Uzbekistan
Films directed by Kiyoshi Kurosawa